Page Creek is a stream in the U.S. state of Washington.

Page Creek bears the name of an early settler.

See also
List of rivers of Washington

References

Rivers of Asotin County, Washington
Rivers of Garfield County, Washington
Rivers of Washington (state)